Krišjānis Rēdlihs (born January 15, 1981) is a Latvian professional ice hockey defenceman who currently plays for HK Kurbads of the Latvian Hockey League (LHL).

Playing career
Krišjānis Rēdlihs started his playing career by playing for HK Liepājas Metalurgs in the Latvian hockey league and Eastern European Hockey League. In 2002, he unexpectedly made the Latvia men's national ice hockey team for 2002 Ice Hockey World Championships. Following the World Championships, Rēdlihs was drafted in 2002 NHL Entry Draft by New Jersey Devils, in the 5th round, 154th overall. He has played for Albany River Rats, the AHL affiliate of New Jersey Devils since then. In 2006, Rēdlihs was briefly called up from Albany to New Jersey Devils but did not play for Devils. He has played for Latvian national team in three World Championships and 2006 Winter Olympics.

Personal
Krišjānis Rēdlihs has three brothers - two of them are also professional hockey players - Jēkabs Rēdlihs and Miķelis Rēdlihs.

Career statistics

Regular season and playoffs

International

References

External links
 
 

1981 births
Living people
Albany River Rats players
Amur Khabarovsk players
Dinamo Riga players
Latvian expatriate ice hockey people
Hamburg Freezers players
HC Fribourg-Gottéron players
HC Kunlun Red Star players
HK Liepājas Metalurgs players
Ice hockey players at the 2006 Winter Olympics
Ice hockey players at the 2010 Winter Olympics
Ice hockey players at the 2014 Winter Olympics
Latvian ice hockey defencemen
Linköping HC players
New Jersey Devils draft picks
Olympic ice hockey players of Latvia
Ice hockey people from Riga
Latvian expatriate sportspeople in the United States
Latvian expatriate sportspeople in Switzerland
Latvian expatriate sportspeople in Russia
Latvian expatriate sportspeople in Sweden
Latvian expatriate sportspeople in Germany
Latvian expatriate sportspeople in China
Expatriate ice hockey players in the United States
Expatriate ice hockey players in Switzerland
Expatriate ice hockey players in Russia
Expatriate ice hockey players in Sweden
Expatriate ice hockey players in Germany
Expatriate ice hockey players in China